August Janson (2 November 1870 – 13 October 1925) was an Estonian politician.

Janson was born Võõpsu. In 1919, he was Minister of Industry and Commerce. He died in Berlin in 1925.

References

1870 births
1925 deaths
Estonian politicians
Government ministers of Estonia
People from Räpina Parish